The monument to King Pedro IV is located in the Liberdade Square in Porto, Portugal.

Details 
The bronze statue on a top of a high column (10 meters) of lioz stone was made of 5 tons of bronze by Célestin Anatole Calmels (sculpture) and Joaquim da Costa Lima (architecture). The column features two-sided pedestal stands which depict the delivery of Pedro’s heart to the representatives of Porto and landing at Mindelo where Pedro IV gave the flag to Tomás de Melo Breyner. These two low-reliefs were originally made of Carrara marble, and they have been replaced with bronze duplicates for protection purposes. The coats of arms of Bragança and Porto have been depicted on the front and back sides of the column and surrounded with oak and bay leaves.

The statue was fused in Belgium and it describes Pedro (in a military uniform on horseback) presenting the constitutional charter (on his right hand) to Porto. The monument was inaugurated in October 1866. It has been classified as Property of Public Interest since 1982.

Gellery

See also 

 Landing at Mindelo
 National Monuments of Portugal
 Liberdade Square (Porto)

References 

Properties of Public Interest in Portugal
Bronze sculptures in Portugal
Monuments of Public Interest in Portugal